The 2022 Knowsley Metropolitan Borough Council election took place on 5 May 2022. One third of councillors — 15 out of 45 — on Knowsley Metropolitan Borough Council were elected. The election took place alongside other local elections across the United Kingdom.

In the previous council election in 2021, Labour maintained its longstanding control of the council, holding 34 seats after the election. The Green Party formed the main opposition with five seats, while independent councillors and the Liberal Democrats held three seats each.

Background

History 

The Local Government Act 1972 created a two-tier system of metropolitan counties and districts covering Greater Manchester, Merseyside, South Yorkshire, Tyne and Wear, the West Midlands, and West Yorkshire starting in 1974. Knowsley was a district of the Merseyside metropolitan county. The Local Government Act 1985 abolished the metropolitan counties, with metropolitan districts taking on most of their powers as metropolitan boroughs. The Liverpool City Region Combined Authority was created in 2014 and began electing the mayor of the Liverpool City Region from 2017. The body was given strategic powers covering a region that encompassed the former Merseyside metropolitan county with the addition of Halton Borough Council.

Since its formation, Knowsley has continuously been under Labour control. The Liberal Democrats had become the main opposition party by the late 1990s, and continued to win seats on the council until the 2010 election, when Labour won every seat. Labour continued to win every seat in subsequent elections until the 2016 election, when three Liberal Democrats were elected. The first Green Party councillor was elected to the borough in the 2018 election, with the Green Party winning a further two seats in each of the 2019 election and 2021 election to become the council's main opposition. After the 2021 election, Labour held 34 seats, the Greens held five and independent councillors and the Liberal Democrats held three each.

The positions up for election in 2021 were last elected in 2018. In that election, Labour won twelve seats on 66.2% of the vote while the Green Party, independents and Liberal Democrats won one seat each on 12.7%, 7.5% and 6.8% of the vote respectively. The Conservatives received 5.4% of the vote but didn't win any seats.

Council term 
The Labour councillor John Morgan resigned from his party in March 2022. The council leader Graham Morgan said that John Morgan had already been suspended from the Labour Party.

Electoral process 
The council previously elected its councillors in thirds, with a third being up for election every year for three years, with no election in the fourth year. However, following a boundary review, all forty-eight councillors will be elected at the same time. The election will take place by multi-member first-past-the-post voting, with each ward being represented by up to three councillors. Electors will be able to vote for as many candidates as there are seats to fill, and the candidates with the most votes in each ward will be elected.

All registered electors (British, Irish, Commonwealth and European Union citizens) living in Knowsley aged 18 or over will be entitled to vote in the election. People who live at two addresses in different councils, such as university students with different term-time and holiday addresses, are entitled to be registered for and vote in elections in both local authorities. Voting in-person at polling stations will take place from 07:00 to 22:00 on election day, and voters will be able to apply for postal votes or proxy votes in advance of the election.

Previous council composition

Results summary

Ward results

Cherryfield

Halewood North

Halewood South

Northwood

Page Moss

Prescot North

Prescot South

Roby

Shevington

St Gabriels

St Michaels

Stockbridge

Swanside

Whiston and Cronton

Whitefield

References 

Council elections in the Metropolitan Borough of Knowsley
Knowsley